Notable people from Jodhpur, India

Maharaja Hanwant Singh
Maharaj Prem Singh, Arjuna Award (first for polo)
Ila Arun, actress and singer
Rajmata Krishna Kumari, politician
Maharaja Gaj Singh, politician
Jai Narayan Vyas, politician
Chitrangada Singh, actress and model
Abhishek Singhvi, politician
Barkatullah Khan, politician
Justice Kan Singh Parihar
Justice Chand Mal Lodha
Justice Rajendra Mal Lodha
Justice Milap Chand Jain
Justice Guman Mal Lodha
Justice Devendra Kachhawaha
Laxmi Mall Singhvi, jurist
Mithali Raj, cricketer
Ashok Gehlot, Current Chief Minister of Rajasthan
Gajendra Singh Shekhawat, Current Jal Shakti Minister (Water Resource Minister)
Ashwini Vaishnaw, Current Railway Minister and IT and Communication Minister
Rao Raja Hanut Singh, British Indian Army soldier and polo player
Kailash Sankhala, conservationist
D.R. Mehta, ex-chairman of SEBI
Man Mohan Sharma, chemical engineer
Suryakanta Vyas, Member of the Legislative Assembly
Major Shaitan Singh Bhati, Indian Army officer
Komal Kothari, ethnomusicologist
Guru Surendra bahadur singh kushwah, Arya marudhar vyam sala jodhpur
Karun Nair, cricketer
Mohammad Faiz, Singer
Achal Das Bohra, engineer
Chanda Kochhar, Managing Director and CEO of ICICI Bank
Sita Ram Lalas, linguist and lexicographer
Sunil Bohra, film producer
Shah Bhopal Chand Lodha, former Public Works Secretary
 Shanno Khurana (b. 1927), Hindustani classical singer, awarded Padma Bhushan
Shailesh Lodha, actor
Ravi Bishnoi, cricketer
Abhay Jodhpurkar, singer

References

See also
Rulers of Jodhpur

 
Jodhpur